Gaularfjellet is a mountain area in central Vestland county, Norway.  The mountains is crossed by the border between the municipalities of Sunnfjord and Sogndal. Norwegian County Road 613 (formerly Norwegian County Road 13, Norwegian National Road 13 and Norwegian National Road 5) crosses the mountains through a pass that follows the river Gaula, and has a hairpin road.

See also
List of mountains of Norway

References

Mountains of Vestland
Sunnfjord
Sogndal